Pentethylcyclanone is an antitussive medication having molecular formula C16H25NO2 .

Synthesis
Pentethylcyclanone can be prepared by alkylation of the anion of the self-condensation product of cyclopentanone with N-(2-chloroethyl)-morpholine.

References

Expectorants
4-Morpholinyl compunds
Cyclopentanes